Kanore is a town in Udaipur district in the Indian state of Rajasthan.

Kanore is a very famous town in Udaipur district for betel leaf and knife.

Geography

Demographics
 India census, Kanor had a population of 12,616. Males constitute 54% of the population and females 46%. Kanor has an average literacy rate of 67%, higher than the national average of 59.5%: male literacy is 78%, and female literacy is 54%. In Kanor, 12% of the population is under 6 years of age.

Nomenclature
There are two myths to be told about nomenclature of "Kanore" town. The first myth is: There was a lady monk "Kani Meeni", who was fasting (tapsaya) in old times. She got divine powers after her tapsaya. On the name of this holy lady, the town named "Kanore"
Second myth is: In this town a large number of followers of Kanha (Krishna) lived. After the name of Kanha, this town named Kanore.

Education

Kanore is in the southern region of Rajasthan at border of tribal caste majority area. Therefore, this area was a lesser educated area in past. But with inspiration of Acharya Shri Jawaharcharya, Mewad malviya Pt Udai Jain established here "Jawahar Vidhyapeeth" for Education evolution in south Rajasthan. This Jawahar Vidhypeeth, with speed growth become educational center for southern Rajasthan. Therefore, Kanore is also known as "Shikhsa Nagari". In this small town education from Balmandir to B. Ed. is available for a long time.

Jawahar Vidhyapeeth School and College give lot of IAS, RAS, CAs, Scientists, Doctors, Engineers, Artist and many more. All are serving humanity in India or aboard India also.
Today in Kanore three education institute giving their services with good hostel facility, Every year students from Kanore are coming in top merit list of state board.

Religious culture
In Jain history Kanore also have a good name. Jainachary Ganeshacharya & Naneshacharya spent varshavas (Chomasa) here. Rajpura (Old name as Rajgarh) situated a far 3 km from Kanore is well known in Mewar region for its Chamatkari Adeshwar Ji temple. this temple is devoted to First Tirthankar Sh Rishabhdev. In Jain history Kanore is called as "Kanakpuri"

Kanore have highest Jain family in area after Udaipur. In April at side of Kamal wala tabab celebrate Ravan Mela which is the biggest festival in kanore.

Visiting places

Adeshware Ji
Adeshware Ji is an ancient Jain Temple near Kanore, about 3 km. Adashware Ji Temple is devoted to First Tirthankar of Jain Sh Rishabh Dev Ji. A Naynabhiram white idole is situated there. It is near about 800 years old. This temple is situated in village of Rajpura, which in known as Rajgad in earlier times. Rajgad is the older than Kanore. Nowadays, after renovation work of more than 2–3 years, temple becomes more beautiful. These temple ultimate peace. Nowadays, many religious programs is going on in Tirth Khetra like Akshay Tritya Parna Mahotsav. There is a fair is also held one in year on Janam kalyanak of Bhagvan Adinath.

Kanore palace 

Kanore palace is situated in the middle of Kanore. Maharana Sangramsingh II of Mewar, granted Kanore Thikana to Maharawat Sarangdev II  in 1711A.D. Kanore place is the royal residence of Maharawat Sarangdev and his family. The palace is built  beautifully in the art and design of Rajputana. The total area of the palace is 1,50,000 Sq.Ft. The palace has three major portions:
 SARANG VILLAS was built 700 years ago by the forefathers of the Kanore Royal family.
 NAHAR NIWAS was built 300 years ago by the forefathers of the Royal Family of Kanore.
 KESAR NIWAS was built 150 years ago by the forefathers of Royal Family of Kanore.

As per the information available on " http://kanorepalace.blogspot.in/", The owner's of the "Raj Mahal Kanore" Rawat Yogeshwar Singh and Rishi Raj Singh wants to convert it into a heritage hotel.

Keleshwar Mahadev

Keleshwar Mahadev is a picnic spot near Kanore towards Dhariyawad. At Keleshwar JI, couple of temples built on the bank of Gomti River. At this place Old Temple of Lord Shiv situated and woeshiped as keleshawar. Later on a Temple of Kesariya Ji (First Tirthnakar Rishabhdev of Jains and Kaliya Bavji of Adivasi samuday) is also built. Kesriya JI first devotee of Adivasi Samuday. Adivasi samuday take oath in front of Kesriya Ji for remove of evil from himself. This Temple is very well worshiped by Adivsai samudya. In rainy season Gomti river is flow here. In rainy season it is a so beautiful. Dal Bati Churma is the famous food menu at this picnic spot.

Bhabhuka Mahadev
Bhabhka Mahadev is also a picnic spot near kanore. There is a peaceful old Temple of Lord shiv between the natural environment. This place gives us peace. In the rainy season peoples from kanore and surroundings are come here and enjoys of picnics. On Mahashivratri a lot of people gathered year and celebrated the function. Right

Kundia Ka Dam

Kundia Ka Dam is a dam near Kanore. It is major source of drinking water for Kanore Overflow of this dam converts in a waterfall. In the rainy season this place becomes more beautiful.

Kamal Wala Talab
Kamal Wala Talab is a pond near Kanore. In old times this is Known for its Kamal flower. Beautiful Kamal flowers rise in surface of pond. But now due to water shortage this not happen. This pond was a major source for bathing and cloth washing in old times. Nowadays persons who liking swimming and pond bathing, goes there for enjoying.

Transportation

Kanore is well connected with rest of district. Kanore is a major station on Udaipur–Dhariywad or Udaipur–Neemuch route. It has direct bus for Udaipur, Neemuch, Pratapgarh, Indore, Ahmedabad, Surat & Mumbai. From Udaipur Airport it is 60 km away.

kanore is also connected with the railway network. it is a station on mavli junction -bari Sadri route.
At present, this route is going to be converted in broad Gage and to be extended till neemuch (a district in M.P.).

Major events
At Kanore, every year many functions, programs and events are celebrated. Major of them is Ahiravan Mela (held in the month of March–April), Republic day celebration, Independence day celebration, Mahaveer Jayanti, Mahashivratri, Holi etc. Certain bhakti sandhyas, Kavi Sammelan, Ramkatha etc. programs are also held on time to time. Some of them are as under:-

Bhavya Bhakti Sandhya was held in Dec 2010. The program was organized by the group "Jainism Youth Society". The program was devoted to Nakoda Bhairav Ji

References

External links

Cities and towns in Udaipur district